Graeme McCall (30 December 1937 – 3 May 2016) was an Australian rower. He competed in the men's eight event at the 1964 Summer Olympics.

References

1937 births
2016 deaths
Australian male rowers
Olympic rowers of Australia
Rowers at the 1964 Summer Olympics
Place of birth missing
Commonwealth Games medallists in rowing
Rowers at the 1962 British Empire and Commonwealth Games
Commonwealth Games gold medallists for Australia
Medallists at the 1962 British Empire and Commonwealth Games
20th-century Australian people